Francis Ashley Phillips (11 April 1873 – 5 March 1955) was a Welsh cricketer who played 108 first-class cricket matches in his career between 1892 and 1919.  He was educated at Rossall School and Exeter College, Oxford. A right-handed batsman and right-arm medium pace bowler, who occasionally kept wicket, Phillips scored 4,310 first-class runs.  He played the majority of his career for Somerset, but also represented the county of his birth, Monmouthshire in second-class cricket.

References

External links
 

1873 births
1955 deaths
Welsh cricketers
Somerset cricketers
Marylebone Cricket Club cricketers
Monmouthshire cricketers
Oxford University cricketers
People educated at Rossall School
Alumni of Exeter College, Oxford